Shine Thura (also spelled Shine Thuya; born  10 March 1996) is a footballer from Burma who plays as a forward for the Myanmar national football team and Samut Sakhon.

International career
Thura made his international debut on 13 October 2015, coming on as a sub for Suan Lam Mang to play the last ten minutes of a 3-1 victory over Laos in a qualification game for the 2018 FIFA World Cup.

References

External links
 
 

1996 births
Living people
People from Mandalay Region
Burmese footballers
Myanmar international footballers
Association football forwards
Yadanarbon F.C. players
Burmese expatriate footballers
Burmese expatriate sportspeople in Thailand
Expatriate footballers in Thailand
Southeast Asian Games silver medalists for Myanmar
Southeast Asian Games medalists in football
Competitors at the 2015 Southeast Asian Games
Competitors at the 2017 Southeast Asian Games
Southern Myanmar F.C. players